Augerville was an unincorporated community in Champaign County, Illinois, United States. Augerville was northeast of Urbana and was near the city's border. By 2017, the community had disappeared.

References

Unincorporated communities in Champaign County, Illinois
Unincorporated communities in Illinois